Bibbulmun may refer to:
 The Bibulman tribe, the traditional owners of the southwestern region of Western Australia, a dialectal group of the Noongar language tribe
Noongar, Indigenous Australians from the Perth (Western Australia) area which includes the Bibbulmun dialectal group
 The Bibbulmun Track, a long walking trail in Western Australia, named after the Bibbulmun of Perth